Greg Lawson may refer to:

 Greg Lawson (British musician), violinist, composer and conductor, lecturer at the Royal Conservatoire of Scotland 
 Greg Lawson (American musician), American songwriter and producer
 Greg Lawson (photographer), American photographer